Kirils Galoha (born April 16, 1996) is a Latvian professional ice hockey forward who plays for GKS Tychy of the Polska Hokej Liga.

Galoha played one game in the Kontinental Hockey League for Dinamo Riga during the 2015–16 KHL season. He departed from the team in 2017, splitting the year in the Latvian Hockey Higher League for HS Rīga and later in the German Oberliga for ECDC Memmingen. He would also divide the 2018–19 season between Latvia and Germany, playing one game for HK Mogo before joining Oberliga side EHC Waldkraiburg. He also played ten games in France for Division 1 side Bisons de Neuilly-sur-Marne.

Galoha joined Kazakhstan team Saryarka Karagandy of the Vysshaya Hockey Liga on June 10, 2019 but only played two games for the team before returning to Latvia to join the newly-founded Olimp Riga on September 23, 2019. On January 14, 2020, Galoha joined GKS Tychy of the Polska Hokej Liga. He became Polish champion. Next season he returned to Olimp Riga, winning also the Latvian league champion title.

References

External links

1996 births
Living people
Bisons de Neuilly-sur-Marne players
Dinamo Riga players
GKS Tychy (ice hockey) players
Latvian ice hockey forwards
Saryarka Karagandy players
Ice hockey people from Riga
Latvian expatriate ice hockey people
Latvian expatriate sportspeople in Germany
Latvian expatriate sportspeople in France